Kit Hawkins is an English entrepreneur and entertainment producer, based in Los Angeles.

Kit Hawkins co-founded Block with NBA Hall-Of-Fame player Steve Nash 

Kit Hawkins is the Co-Founder of the creative agency Sunshine Sunshine represents leading fashion, luxury and lifestyle brands such as Dior, Adidas, Grey Goose and Balmain. Sunshine has offices in London, Los Angeles and Beijing.

At Sunshine he has produced Gucci's Chime for Change featuring Beyoncé, Off-Script featuring Jamie Foxx, Denzel Washington, Dwayne Johnson and Melissa McCarthy and the Emmy Nominated feature documentary My Beautiful Broken Brain

He co-founded the music management company, Everybody's with Adam Tudhope. Clients include Keane, Laura Marling and Mumford & Sons. Along with Marcus Mumford and Carey Mulligan, he is one of the founders of the annual Warchild Winter Wassail. Kit Hawkins also represented David de Rothschild, developing the Plastiki project and producing the TV series Eco-Trip for NBC

Kit Hawkins created the entertainment division of the advertising agency, Mother In 2012, along with Al Maccuish, he was one of the Executive Producers of Amnesty International's The Secret Policeman's Ball at Radio City, New York. The show featured many comedians, including Ben Stiller, Jon Stewart, Russell Brand and Kristen Wiig. The musical artists were Coldplay and Mumford & Sons  Along with Al Maccuish, Kit Hawkins developed and led Coca-Cola's 2012 Olympics Campaign.

Kit Hawkins founded the 3D production company Nineteen Fifteen Productions which produced the world's first live 3D television broadcast, filming Keane Live at Abbey Road for Sky. Other productions include Kylie Minogue Live in Toronto and Burberry's Fashion Show, which was broadcast live around the world. Kit Hawkins has also produced a number of music videos for artists including Madonna and Goldfrapp.

In 2005, the film Call Register, produced by Kit Hawkins, was nominated for a BAFTA.

On 6 September 2007 Kit Hawkins was honored by the United Nations for his role as the worldwide producer of Al Gore's Live Earth. Seven of the films commissioned and executive produced by Kit Hawkins opened the 2007 Tribeca Film Festival. They were introduced from the stage by Robert De Niro and Al Gore.

Kit Hawkins has worked with Richard Curtis on a number of projects including Make Poverty History and Live8. In 2005, they co-created the Click Film  featuring George Clooney and Brad Pitt

Kit Hawkins is an advisor to the US National Premier Soccer League club, City of Angels FC

Kit Hawkins is married to Jade Anderson, daughter of Yes singer Jon Anderson

References

External links

Living people
Year of birth missing (living people)